A Psalm for the Wild-Built is a 2021 solarpunk novella written by American author Becky Chambers and was published by Tor.com on July 13, 2021. It is the first book in the Monk & Robot duology, followed by A Prayer for the Crown-Shy, which was released on July 12, 2022. It won the Hugo Award in 2022.

Background 
In 2018, for its Tor.com Publishing imprint, Tor Books commissioned science fiction author Becky Chambers to write a two-book novella series within the emerging solarpunk genre. Chambers's debut novel, The Long Way to a Small, Angry Planet (2014), and its sequel, A Closed and Common Orbit (2016), in the Wayfarers series, had both been nominated for the Arthur C. Clarke Award and she would continue writing that series as she worked on these new solarpunk novellas. By the time of the first novella's release in 2021, the 36-year-old Chambers, living in northern California, had won the Hugo Award for Best Series for the Wayfarers series whose fourth novel, The Galaxy, and the Ground Within, had been published earlier that year.

Synopsis 
On a moon called Panga where AI and robots are a distant myth, Dex is an adventurous and friendly tea monk who travels the human-populated areas of their moon meeting villagers and townsfolk. Dex custom-blends tea fit to the folks' needs and personalities, and they confide their misgivings to the monk. One day Dex, seeking a change in their routine, travels into the wild and meets a robot named Splendid Speckled Mosscap and they are thrown into a road-trip with a question on their minds: "What do people need?"

Major themes 
The setting of the story, Panga, is seen undergoing rewilding. The story also depicts humans and robots having independence from one another, while issues such as overpopulation and oil overusage taking up landscape are seen in the foreground. Also touched on are issues of therapy, satisfaction and finding a purpose.

Publication and reception 
The novella was published by the Tom Doherty Associates division of Macmillan Publishers and released on July 13, 2021, as a hardcover, ebook and audiobook. Its 4 hour long audiobook is narrated by Emmett Grosland.

Critics praised the novella as a feel-good, "joyful experience" with Jacob Aron of New Scientist saying that it left a "warm, fuzzy feeling inside" after reading. Publishers Weekly enjoyed the "characteristic nuance and careful thought" offered by Chambers, touching on the way A Psalm for the Wild-Built was a "cozy, wholesome meditation on the nature of consciousness and its place in the natural world." Writer Amal El-Mohtar criticized "moments...found jarring in their familiarity, where the thing depicted is so fundamentally at odds with the society Dex seems to inhabit that [it feels] dislocat[ing]." She found that seeing issues such as social media usage being pitted against "Dex's world of generosity and equity" was jarring, but praised the hopeful and optimistic tone all the same.

References

American novellas
Hugo Award for Best Novella winning works
2021 science fiction novels
Tor Books books